Adeline Boutain (11 April 1862 - 13 February 1946) was a French photographer and publisher of postcards.

Life
Boutain was born in Machecoul. She was interested in subjects having to do with her country such as cityscapes, seascapes, street photography, buildings, places of interest, and religious or secular events.

Boutain died at Saint-Gilles-Croix-de-Vie in 1946.

References

External links

 Collection Adeline Boutain 1862-1946 Saint-Gilles-Croix-de-Vie 

French photographers
French women photographers
1862 births
1946 deaths
Postcard publishers
People from Loire-Atlantique